Bagnolo di Po is a comune in the province of Rovigo, in Veneto, northern Italy.  It is bounded by other communes of Castelguglielmo, Trecenta, Canda, and Ficarolo.

References

Cities and towns in Veneto